Newcastle was an electoral district of the House of Assembly in the Australian state of South Australia from 1884 to 1902 and again from 1915 to 1956.

The Newcastle electorate was based in the southern Flinders Ranges. In 1938, the polling places were Beltana, Blinman, Copley, Lynhurst Siding, Parachilna, Wooltana, Belton, Carrieton, Eurelia, Johnburgh, Yanyarrie, Cradock, Hawker, Hookina, Mernmerna, Warcowie, Farina, Marree, Oodnadatta, Bangor, Booleroo Centre, Melrose, Murray Town, Terka, Willowie, Wilmington, Black Rock, Morchard, Orroroo, Pekina, Walloway, Yatina, Boolcunda East, Bruce, Gordon, Hammond, Moockra, Wilson, Wyacca.

Members

Election results

References 

Former electoral districts of South Australia
1884 establishments in Australia
1902 disestablishments in Australia
1915 establishments in Australia
1956 disestablishments in Australia